Apatopygidae is a family of echinoderms belonging to the order Cassiduloida.

Genera:
 Apatopygus Hawkins, 1920 
 Jolyclypus Lambert, 1918 
 Nucleopygus L.Agassiz, 1840 
 Porterpygus Baker, 1983

References

 
Cassiduloida
Echinoderm families